Softhard is a Chinese rap duo from Hong Kong, consisting of DJ Hard "Jan Lamb" and MC Soft "Eric Kot".
The rap duo is widely accredited for pioneering the hip hop act to achieve mainstream minor success during the early 1990s while on an independent label during the late 1980s. The duo appeared in director Wong Jing's live-action City Hunter film, performing the song "Gala Gala Happy."

Discography

Albums 
 Softhard self titled debut (1991)
 Softhard Mix I (1993)
 Softhard Mix II (1993)
 The Lost Tapes (1993)
 SH Special (1999)
 Softhard Alliance (2005)
 Softhard Refill (2005)
 Long Time No See (2006)
 Softhard '06 Summer League (2006)

Hong Kong hip hop groups
Hip hop duos
Hong Kong male comedians
Hong Kong boy bands
Cantopop musical groups
Musical groups established in 1988
Musical groups disestablished in 1995
Musical groups reestablished in 2006
Hong Kong idols
Pop music duos
Male musical duos